The Women's sprint competition at the 2022 UCI Track Cycling World Championships was held on 13 and 14 October 2022.

Results

Qualifying
The qualifying was started on 13 October at 14:00. The top four riders advanced directly to the 1/8 finals; places 5 to 28 advanced to the 1/16 final.

1/16 finals
The 1/16 finals were started on 13 October at 15:29.

1/8 finals
The 1/8 finals were started on 13 October at 16:21.

Quarterfinals
The quarterfinals were started on 13 October at 18:30.

Semifinals
The semifinals were started on 14 October at 19:24.

Finals
The Finals were started on 14 October at 20:51.

References

Women's sprint